The 1996–97 WHL season was the 31st season for the Western Hockey League.  Eighteen teams completed a 72-game season.  The Lethbridge Hurricanes won the President's Cup.

League notes
The Edmonton Ice joined the WHL as its 18th franchise, playing in the Central Division.
The Swift Current Broncos moved to the East Division.

Regular season

Final standings

Scoring leaders
Note: GP = Games played; G = Goals; A = Assists; Pts = Points; PIM = Penalties in minutes

Goaltending leaders
Note: GP = Games played; Min = Minutes played; W = Wins; L = Losses; T = Ties ; GA = Goals against; SO = Total shutouts; SV% = Save percentage; GAA = Goals against average

1997 WHL Playoffs
Top eight teams in the Eastern Conference (East and Central divisions) qualified for playoffs
Top six teams in the Western Conference (division) qualified for the playoffs

Conference Quarterfinals

Eastern Conference

Western Conference

Conference semifinals

Conference finals

WHL Championship

All-Star game

On January 22, the Western Conference defeated the Eastern Conference 7–5 at Spokane, Washington before a WHL record crowd of 10,455.

WHL awards

All-Star Teams

See also
1997 Memorial Cup
1997 NHL Entry Draft
1996 in sports
1997 in sports

References
whl.ca
 2005–06 WHL Guide

Western Hockey League seasons
WHL
WHL